The 2006 FIBA World Championship for Women held in Brazil had the following squads.  The list includes the 12-women rosters of 8 teams of the 16 participating countries, totaling 172 players.

Group A

Argentina
Head coach: Eduardo Pinto

Brazil
Head coach: Antônio Carlos Barbosa

Senegal
Head coach: Maguette Diop

South Korea
Head coach: Soo Jong Yoo

Spain
Head coach: Domingo Díaz

Group B

Australia
Head coach: Jan Stirling

Canada
Head coach: Allison McNeill

Group C

USA
Head coach: Anne Donovan

Group D

France
Head coach: Alain Jardel

References

squads
FIBA Women's Basketball World Cup squads